The Loyola Memorial Park is a cemetery and columbarium in Marikina, Metro Manila, Philippines

Background
The Loyola Memorial Park in Marikina is a cemetery and columbarium was established in 1964. It was developed by Group Developers, Inc. The company operates a second Loyola Memorial Park in Sucat, Parañaque.

Monuments and memorials
The Loyola Memorial Park hosts the Last Supper of Jesus Christ monument which marks the complex's columbarium. The Bulaklak ng Pakikiramay(Flowers of Condolences) is an area within the park which is dedicated to Marikina City Police officers who have died.

Notable burials and internments
 Fernando Amorsolo (1892–1972), National Artist of the Philippines
 Nida Blanca (1936–2001), actress
 Julie Vega (1968–1985), actress
 Francis Magalona (1964–2009), rapper
 Miriam Defensor Santiago (1945–2016), former Senator, and politician. She was buried next to her son Alexander Santiago.
 German Moreno (1933–2016), Master Showman host, talent, actor
 Ernesto Maceda (1935–2016), former Senator, lawyer and politician
 Jay Ilagan (1953–1992), actor
 Johnny Delgado (1948–2009), Veteran actor, comedian and writer
 Nita Javier (1932–2012), actress
 César Ramírez (1956–2005), actor, comedian, production coordinator
 Von Serna (1939–1994), film actor
 Cecille Iñigo, also known as Dabiana (1952–2005), actress-comedian
 Luz Fernandez (1935–2022), film, theater, television and radio actress of DZRH
 Amalia Fuentes (1940–2019), actress and movie queen
 Arvin "Tado" Jimenez (1974–2014), comedian, actor, radio personality, businessman
 Jovy Marcelo (1965–1992), filipino race car driver
 Amado Cortez (1927–2003), film actor
 Gloria Sevilla (1932–2022), film actress
 Nikka Alejar (1975–2017), tv and radio host
 Joey Gosiengfiao (1941–2007), movie director, producer and writer
 Eddie del Mar (1919–1986), Actor, screenwriter, director, filmmaker
 Karina Constantino David (1946–2009), chairperson of the Civil Service Commission of the Philippines

Incidents 
On February 8, 2011, Loyola Memorial Park was the site of the suicide of General Angelo Reyes, who served as Armed Forces of the Philippines Chief of Staff and later as secretary of National Defense, DILG, DENR, and Department of Energy. Fronting his parents' graves, the retired general and politician shot himself with a .45 caliber pistol and slumped on his mother's marker; he was rushed to Quirino Memorial Medical Center and was declared dead on arrival. The incident happened in the midst of corruption investigations against Reyes on account of the "monetary gift scheme" (known in the Filipino language as "pabaon") in the Armed Forces wherein he received a cash gift, known as send-off money, amounting to PHP50 million, which was said to have been acquired through malpractices. A groundskeeper employed by the cemetery was on a morning shift that day, working as a gardener when he witnessed the incident; he later testified that he overheard Reyes' last words, "I'm Sorry", before the gunfire.

References

Cemeteries in Metro Manila
Landmarks in the Philippines
Buildings and structures in Marikina